Europe Tonight is an evening television business news programme which was broadcast on CNBC Europe from 2004 to 2009. The programme was most recently presented by Guy Johnson and Anna Edwards.

History
The original Europe Tonight was a 30-minute market review broadcast on weekdays at 6:30pm CET until 2001. The programme was relaunched in September 2004, and replaced Frankfurt Closing Bell, which was shown at 8pm CET and co-presented from the Frankfurt Stock Exchange by Silvia Wadhwa and by Simon Hobbs in London. Until 2004, the Deutsche Börse remained open later than the other European markets - until 20:00 CET. After the hours of electronic trading on the Xetra system were changed so as to stop at 17:30 CET, Wadhwa remained as co-host of the new Europe Tonight.

The programme time, previously filled by updates on late German trade was replaced by interviews with Frankfurt-based strategists, commentators and CEOs. The remainder of this version of the programme was essentially an update of European Closing Bell, in which Hobbs reviewed the day's business events and covered any late breaking news.

The programme length was extended from 30 minutes to one hour on 26 March 2007 as part of schedule changes at the network, which also saw European Closing Bell have its runtime halved. Johnson was installed as presenter, the show was given a new title sequence and its theme music was changed from that formerly used by Closing Bell to that used by Street Signs before December 2005. The format of the programme was heavily revamped, gaining some of the segments previously contained in the second hour of European Closing Bell, such as a daily Guest Investor.  New features introduced included The Editor, where the editor of a European business publication discussed how they will be covering notable events, and an update on the U.S. markets which came live from the NASDAQ MarketSite. Wadhwa no longer acted as co-host of Europe Tonight, but remained a contributor to the show. Anna Martin joined Johnson as co-host of the programme in January 2008, having previously been the show's regular reporter.

The show's timeslot was brought forward by an hour to 7pm CET from 4 February 2008.

Europe Tonight did not return after the 2009 Christmas holiday season.

See also
European Closing Bell
Closing Bell

External links
 Europe Tonight - CNBC.com

CNBC World original programming
CNBC Europe original programming
British television news shows
1998 British television series debuts
2009 British television series endings
Business-related television series in the United Kingdom
British television series revived after cancellation